Puzha may refer to:

Puzha (film), a 1980 Malayalam film directed by Jeassy
Padunna Puzha, a 1968 Malayalam film directed by M. Krishnan Nair